Litiopa is a genus of sea snails, marine gastropod mollusks in the family Litiopidae.

Species
Species within the genus Litiopa include:
 Litiopa melanostoma (Rang, 1829)
 Litiopa nipponica Kuroda & Kawamoto, 1956
 Litiopa tumescens (Thiele, 1925)
Species brought into synonymy
 Litiopa bucciniformis Hornung & Mermod, 1926: synonym of Bittium proteum (Jousseaume, 1931)
 Litiopa effusa C. B. Adams, 1850: synonym of Monoplex pilearis (Linnaeus, 1758)
 Litiopa obesa C. B. Adams, 1850: synonym of Gutturnium muricinum (Röding, 1798)
 Litiopa saxicola C. B. Adams, 1852: synonym of Elachisina saxicola (C. B. Adams, 1852)

References

 Gofas, S.; Le Renard, J.; Bouchet, P. (2001). Mollusca, in: Costello, M.J. et al. (Ed.) (2001). European register of marine species: a check-list of the marine species in Europe and a bibliography of guides to their identification. Collection Patrimoines Naturels, 50: pp. 180–213
 Bouchet P. (2002) Gone with the wind: a pelagic marine snail described as an endemic land snail from the Bahamas. The Nautilus 116(1):32-35.
 Spencer, H.; Marshall. B. (2009). All Mollusca except Opisthobranchia. In: Gordon, D. (Ed.) (2009). New Zealand Inventory of Biodiversity. Volume One: Kingdom Animalia. 584 pp

External links
 

Litiopidae
Monotypic gastropod genera